is a Japanese manga series written and illustrated by Lily Hoshino. It began serialization in November 2006 in the monthly seinen manga magazine Comic Birz. The first tankōbon volume was released by Gentosha in January 2008; as of March 2015, ten volumes have been released. An anime adaptation produced by J.C.Staff and directed by Chiaki Kon airing in Japan from October to December 2010.

The author announced in October 2016 that she was putting all her manga on hiatus to take care of her newborn son. Hoshino added she hopes to return to her regular work as soon as possible.

Plot 
During the Westernization of an alternate Japan, humans and spirits coexist. To maintain harmony between the two, the Ministry of Spirits is established and humans and spirit representatives are chosen. Lieutenants Kei Agemaki, Riken Yoshinokazura, and Ganryu Hanakiri are chosen to be the human representatives and are partnered with Zakuro, Susukihotaru, and Bonbori and Hozuki, respectively. However, Zakuro cannot stand humans who accept Jesuit practices so easily and Agemaki has a severe fear of spirits.

Characters

Main characters

Zakuro is an impulsive and assertive half-spirit girl who looks like a beautiful girl with fox ears atop her head. She is chosen to be a spirit representative in the Ministry of Spirit Affairs. However, she is opposed to the idea of forming the Ministry and believes that allowing humans and their Jesuit ideas into the manor is disgusting. Despite this, she becomes smitten with Agemaki Kei shortly after the two are partnered. Once she learns that he is afraid of spirits, her opinion of him is greatly diminished and she constantly calls him a coward. She dislikes how easily humans accept Westernization and hates the changes it brings, such as drinking milk, as a result. Zakuro is upset by how spirits are being driven out of their homes because of Westernization when humans had respected the spirits in the past. It is revealed that when pregnant human girls are spirited away, they return carrying half-spirit infants. The girls, said to be possessed by fox spirits, are shunned and are immediately taken away or killed at birth. Zakuro's mother, Tsukuhane, was spirited away twice, once before Zakuro was born and again when Zakuro was older. Zakuro's mother never returned the second time. Because of this, Zakuro passionately investigates cases where girls have been spirited away, hoping that she can learn something about her mother. In addition, Kushimatsu states that because Zakuro was shunned at birth, she is seeking acceptance from Agemaki, whom she trusts. As the series progress she falls in love with Kei but doesn't know how to express her feelings. When she fights spirits, Mamezo provides her with a branch of cherry blossoms that turns into a knife.

Agemaki is a second lieutenant in the imperial army. He is chosen to be a human representative in the Ministry of Spirit Affairs and is partnered with Zakuro. However, he has a severe fear of spirits and a fear of heights. He tries to hide the fact that he is afraid of spirits because of what his father might say about it. When Agemaki expressed his fear of spirits as a child, his father yelled at him. In addition, shortly after seeing a spirit, he learned that his cat Itsue disappeared, leading Agemaki to believe that the spirit caused Itsue's disappearance. It is also alluded to that his mother and sister have some kind of spiritual power (or possibly being spirits themselves) since they can see spirits that humans do not and Kei's mother knew that Zakuro was a half-spirit even though she hid her ears. At the start of the series, he panics upon seeing full-blooded spirits, such as Amaryōju and Mamezo, and becomes so afraid, he asks Zakuro, who is easier to accept because of her more human appearance, to accompany him to the outhouse. Afterward, he makes an effort to understand Zakuro and other spirits, although this causes him to make the wrong conclusions, like offering the half-fox spirit Zakuro a candle to eat when he does not realize fox spirits do not actually eat candles. As the series progress he begins to fall in love with Zakuro and even confessed to her in the last episode. He begins to accepts spirits and is later able to play with Sakura and Kiri even though they scared him at the beginning of the series.

Susukihotaru is a beautiful and shy half-spirit girl. She is chosen to be a spirit representative in the Ministry of Spirit Affairs and is partnered with Yoshinokazura Riken. Initially, she wants to be partnered with someone else, as she thought Yoshinokazura is big and scary. Upon hearing this, he crouches down and asks her if he is still scary. After this, their relationship greatly improves. When Susukihotaru was first brought to the manor by Kushimatsu, Susukihotaru did not have the power to fight, but once she met Zakuro she realized the spiritual power she possessed. Because of this, Zakuro means the world to her. Susukihotaru is able to empathize with objects and other people through physical contact. When she is possessed by a sword, she cuts Yoshinokazura's hand and can sense his concern for her. She feels that she is undeserving of this concern. When she learns that he appreciates her ability to know what he is feeling, she tells him that she hopes he knows what she is feeling too. She looks at the ground when surrounded by people because she is afraid to look humans in the eye, but she later says that she is no longer bothered by the people around her because she is with Yoshinokazura. When Zakuro fights, Susukihotaru assists her by singing and waving a branch of cherry blossoms provided by Sakura and Kiri.

Riken is a straight-faced and stoic second lieutenant in the imperial army. He is chosen to be a human representative in the Ministry of Spirit Affairs and is paired with Susukihotaru. When he overhears that she is afraid of him because of his height, he crouches down and asks her if he is still scary. After this, their relationship greatly improved. He cares for Susukihotaru greatly, and she senses this when she injures his hand while she is possessed by a sword. He describes himself as a man of few words and does not have a problem with Susukihotaru reading his emotions.

 and 

Bonbori and Hozuki are beautiful and cheerful half-spirit girls. They are chosen as spirit representatives in the Ministry of Spirit Affairs and are partnered with Hanakiri Ganryu. They think the idea of a Ministry of Spirit Affairs sounds like fun and are delighted to be working with humans. They immediately take a liking to Hanakiri and tease him about many things he says. They become extremely excited and happy when they learn Hanakiri can tell them apart despite the fact that they are exactly identical except for their voices. When Zakuro fights, they assist by singing and waving a branch of cherry blossoms provided by Sakura and Kiri.

Bonbori and Hozuki specialize in magic petals, which they attach to people and use to sense the presence of that person. However, the petals only work when one of the twins is singing. When a petal is destroyed, the singing twin is injured because they put part of their soul into the petals.

When they were children, the twins lived alone is a dark cave. From time to time, a woman would bring them food and clothing. She called them Bonbori and Hozuki and told them to stay in the cave during the day and to never approach any other humans. They obeyed and only went outside at night, playing and searching for fruit and roots to eat. One day, the woman stopped coming, and they searched for her every night. They did not find her, but they found something they never saw before, other humans. One of the humans, upon hearing them mention the woman, blamed Bonbori and Hozuki for his wife's death. In his rant, it's revealed that the woman visiting them was their mother, but they themselves do not seem to be aware of this. The pair tried to run away and soon found themselves on Kushimatsu's back.

Ganryu is a proud second lieutenant in the imperial army. He is chosen to be a human representative in the Ministry of Spirit Affairs and is partnered with Bonbori and Hozuki. He is able to tell the twins apart while they were trying to confuse him despite the fact that they are exactly identical except for their voices. It's indicated that for his age, he is advanced in terms of intelligence and skill.

Zakuro's artifact spirit who appears as a sandy colored rabbit with fangs. He is able to talk. However, when Bonbori and Hozuki first arrived at the house, he only repeated everything he heard. When Zakuro refuses to work with Agemaki, Mamezo acts as Agemaki's partner instead. Mamezo provides Zakuro a branch of cherry blossoms which can be used as a knife by pulling one out of his mouth.

Kushimatsu is a full-blooded fox spirit, with a head resembling a cartoonish weasel, that receives cases from those seeking aid from the Ministry of Spirit Affairs. She is also the one who brought Bonbori, Hozuki, Suskihotaru, and Zakuro from different regions to live together and takes care of them.

Amaryoju is a spirit who is similar to a baku. He chose Zakuro, Susukihotaru, Bonbori and Hozuki as representatives for the spirits because they are half-spirits who are neither human nor spirit.

 and 

Sakura and Kiri are playful pumpkin-headed spirits. They are extremely small in size. They provide Susukihotaru, Bonbori, and Hozuki branches of cherry blossoms which are used as weapons by pulling the branches out of their mouths.

Antagonists

Hanadate is a lieutenant. He assists the Ministry of Spirit Affairs on their first assignment by compromising between the client and the Ministry. Zakuro is smitten with him after, and she tries to make a good impression on him and appears to take a great interest in her appearance during times when he visits.  It is revealed that his name Hanadate is a fake, with his real name being Omodaka. While using his real persona, he is seen wearing a yukata and a mask. He is manipulating the twins, Rangui, and the Ministry of Spirit Affairs for his own agenda, which involves Zakuro, whom he claims is perfect to "bear his child". For this reason he is obsessed with her to the point of harassing Byakuroku sexually after she was given some of Zakuro's powers, and eventually mistreats Rangui despite her crush on him.

It is later shown that lieutenant Hanadate is, in fact, Zakuro's older half brother. He is indirectly the reason Zakuro's father is dead, since when looking for his mother he witnessed Enaga (Zakuro's father) and Tsukuhane kissing and told his father which made his father furious. He would not even allow his mother to speak his name when she called to him. He kept telling her that she had no right to use his name, for she was a disgrace in his eyes, and his father's eyes. However, this was due to his want for his mother's attention, his jealousy of Enaga, and his lonely upbringing.

 and 

Daidai and Byakuroku are sisters who serve under Rangui. In the military gala case they helped Rangui to stop the Ministry of Spirit Affairs members from interfering with her plans, and in episode 8 they capture Suskihotaru and Agemaki and locked them in an earthen cellar to lure Zakuro to a trap. They envy Zakuro for growing up in a happy home, having people to love and protect, and they envy her freedom.

Byakuroku and Daidai work as servants in the Village of the Oracles, where Byakuroku makes great efforts and overworks her body's resistance so she can protect her younger sister Daidai, who is more ignorant of the fact that they are being used and harbors some jealousy of what she thinks is favoritism of her older sister.

Rangui is one of the main villains of the series who keeps targeting Zakuro. The sisters Daidai and Byakuroku serve her. Rangui thinks Daidai is just a dirty little half-spirit and a failure, but Rangui told Byakuroku that as long as she continues to serve her then Daidai will be treated the same way Byakuroku is. Rangui is able to use sorcery through paper, and is capable of transforming into a large and hideous spider-like monster. It is shown that Rangui has feelings for lieutenant Hanadate, but she soon learns that Hanadate is only using her to get what he wants. He wants Zakuro to bear his child, and when Rangui learns this she is furious and attacks Zakuro.

Media

Manga 
The Otome Yōkai Zakuro manga is written and illustrated by Lily Hoshino. It has been serialized in the seinen manga magazine Comic Birz since the January 2007 issue released on November 30, 2006, with publication ongoing. The chapters have been collected by Gentosha in tankōbon volumes. The first volume was released on January 24, 2008; as of March 2015, ten volumes have been released.

Volume list

Anime 
An anime adaptation produced by J.C.Staff and directed by Chiaki Kon began airing in Japan on October 5, 2010. The series is simulcast by Crunchyroll, making the anime available in the United States, Canada, United Kingdom, Ireland, Sweden, Denmark, Norway, Finland, Iceland, Netherlands, Australia, New Zealand, Brazil, and Portugal. In a press release, the Crunchyroll Vice President of Licensing Rob Pereyda stated: "These kind of unique adventure titles, full of intricate exposition and engaging plotlines, are just what Crunchyroll needs. What we love about Otome Yokai Zakuro is the very combination of intriguing concept, exciting story and fantastic animation the title has. We look forward to an overwhelmingly positive fan reaction forthcoming."
Opening theme song for Otome Yokai Zakuro is "Moon Signal" performed by Sphere. NIS America announced on March 5, 2012 that they have licensed the anime and will be releasing it on DVD in the US on June 12, 2012 as the Zakuro Complete Series in a premium edition.

Episode list

Reception

References

External links
  
  

2006 manga
2010 anime television series debuts
2010 Japanese television series endings
Gentosha manga
J.C.Staff
Seinen manga
Supernatural anime and manga
Television shows written by Mari Okada
TV Tokyo original programming
Yōkai in anime and manga